This is a list of the main career statistics of Argentine professional tennis player, Juan Martín del Potro. To date, Del Potro has won 22 Association of Tennis Professionals (ATP) singles titles, including one Grand Slam singles title at the 2009 US Open and one Masters 1000 singles title at the 2018 BNP Paribas Open. He was also the runner-up at the 2009 ATP World Tour Finals, a semi-finalist at the 2009 and 2018 French Opens and 2013 Wimbledon Championships, a quarterfinalist at the Australian Open in 2009 and 2012, a bronze medalist at the 2012 London Olympics, and a silver medalist at the 2016 Rio Olympics. On August 13, 2018, Del Potro achieved a career-high singles ranking of world No. 3 for the first time.

Career achievements

In 2008, Del Potro became the first player in ATP history to win his first four career titles in as many tournaments. This achievement is also the second-longest winning streak by a teenager in the Open Era, behind Rafael Nadal. Later that year, del Potro reached his first Grand Slam singles quarterfinal at the US Open, losing to Andy Murray in four sets. On October 6, 2008 Del Potro entered the top 10 of the ATP Singles Rankings for the first time in his career. His strong results throughout the year allowed him to qualify for the year-ending ATP World Tour Finals for the first time in his career. However, he failed to progress beyond the preliminary round-robin stage, losing two of the three matches he played. Nonetheless, Del Potro finished the year as world No. 9, the first time he had finished a year in the Top 10.

Del Potro's good form carried over into the new year as he reached his second successive Grand Slam singles quarterfinal at the Australian Open, losing to world No. 2 and eventual runner-up Roger Federer. In June of the same year, del Potro reached his first Grand Slam singles semi-final at the French Open, where he once again lost to the world No. 2 and eventual champion, Roger Federer, this time in five sets. This marked the first time that del Potro had taken a set from Federer. In August, del Potro reached his first ATP Masters Series singles final at the Rogers Cup in Canada, losing to Andy Murray in three sets. Later that year, del Potro reached his first US Open final by defeating then-world no. 3 Rafael Nadal in the semi-finals in straight sets. Del Potro went on to win his first Grand Slam singles title by defeating world no. 1 and five-time defending champion Roger Federer for the first time in his career, prevailing in five sets. In November, del Potro lost to Nikolay Davydenko in the final of the ATP World Tour Finals in straight sets.

In January 2010, del Potro achieved a career-high singles ranking of world No. 4, but a wrist injury prevented him from competing for most of the year. In February 2011, del Potro won his first singles title since returning to the tour from injury, defeating Janko Tipsarević in the final of the Delray Beach International Tennis Championships. Later that year, del Potro reached the fourth round of the Wimbledon Championships for the first time in his career, but lost in four sets to world No. 1 and eventual runner-up, Rafael Nadal. In January 2012, del Potro reached his first Grand Slam singles quarterfinal since returning from injury at the 2012 Australian Open, but lost in straight sets to Roger Federer in a rematch of their quarterfinal match at the same event from three years prior. At the 2012 London Olympics, del Potro progressed to the semi-finals, where he lost to Federer in a four-hour, three-set match. However, he won the bronze medal by defeating world no. 2 Novak Djokovic in straight sets.

In March 2013, del Potro defeated Murray and Djokovic at BNP Paribas Open to reach his first ATP Masters 1000 final since returning from injury, where he lost to Rafael Nadal in three sets. Later that year, del Potro reached his first Wimbledon semi-final, but lost in five sets to the eventual runner-up, Novak Djokovic. With this achievement, del Potro had reached the quarterfinals or better at all four Grand Slam events. In October, del Potro reached his third ATP Masters 1000 final at the 2013 Shanghai Rolex Masters, after defeating Rafael Nadal in the semi-finals in straight sets. However, he lost to the defending champion, Novak Djokovic in the final in three sets. In March 2018, del Potro finally won a Masters 1000 tournament in his fourth final, by defeating Roger Federer at the 2018 BNP Paribas Open.

As of March 2018, del Potro has notched 10 wins over No. 1-ranked players, 3 over Nadal, 4 over Federer, and 3 over Djokovic. All of his wins came in high-profile events including the ATP Tour World Tour Finals, grand slams, the Olympics, Masters 1000 events, and Davis Cup play. He is also one of only three players to have notched 3+ wins over each of the Big-4, along with Stan Wawrinka and Tomas Berdych.

Performance timelines

Singles

Doubles

Grand Slam tournament finals

Singles: 2 (1 title, 1 runner-up)

Other significant finals

Olympics medal matches

Singles: 2 (1 silver medal, 1 bronze medal)

Year-end championships finals

Singles: 1 (1 runner-up)

Masters 1000 finals

Singles: 4 (1 title, 3 runner-ups)

ATP career finals

Singles: 35 (22 titles, 13 runner-ups)

Doubles: 1 (1 title)

ATP Challenger and ITF Futures finals

Singles: 8 (6–2)

Doubles: 5 (2–3)

Team competition finals: 3 (1 title, 2 runner-ups)

Head-to-head record vs. top-10 ranked players

Del Potro's ATP-only match record against players who have been ranked world No. 10 or higher, with those who are active in boldface.

 Statistics correct .

Wins over top-10 players per season
He has a  record against players who were, at the time the match was played, ranked in the top 10. He has also achieved 10 victories against Number 1 ranked players without reaching the top spot himself, an Open Era record.

ATP Tour career earnings

* Statistics correct .

Notes

References

External links
 
 
 

Del Potro, Juan Martin